Greig Lake is a lake in Meadow Lake Provincial Park in the Canadian Province of Saskatchewan in the boreal forest ecozone of Canada. On the eastern shore of the lake is the resort village of Greig Lake and Greig Lake Campground. The south-west corner of the lake has a resort called Waters Edge Eco Lodge. The lake is accessed from Highway 224 at the south end.

The entirety of Greig Lake is within Meadow Lake Provincial Park and it is located just north of the Waterhen River and north-east of Rusty and Kimball Lakes. The four Mustus Lakes, First, Second, Third, and Fourth, are to the west. Several small creeks flow into the lake and, at the south end, a creek  flows out and into the Waterhen River via a fish trap . The lake is in the Beaver River watershed, which is part of the Churchill River and Hudson Bay drainage basin.

Recreation
Located in Saskatchewan's largest provincial park, there are many amenities and activities in and around the lake. Greig Lake Campground is located at Greig Beach, which is a sandy beach about 50 metres in length, on the eastern shore. There are 150 individual campsites plus two group campgrounds, an 18-hole minigolf course, two boat launches, a store, and boat rentals. There are also showers, laundry, washrooms, and a sani-dump available. The park also has tennis courts, a baseball field, and a visitor's centre rep.

On the south-west corner of the lake is Waters Edge Eco Lodge. It is a full-service resort with cabin rentals.

Fish species
Northern pike, walleye, yellow perch, Burbot, and lake Whitefish are common fish species found in the lake.

See also
List of lakes of Saskatchewan
Tourism in Saskatchewan

References

Lakes of Saskatchewan
Meadow Lake No. 588, Saskatchewan
Division No. 17, Saskatchewan